The 2022 FA Trophy Final was an association football match played at Wembley Stadium, London, on 22 May 2022. It was contested between National League teams Wrexham and Bromley. The match decided the winners of the 2021–22 FA Trophy, a knockout tournament comprising clubs from teams at levels 5–8 of the English National League System. It was Wrexham's third appearance in the final and the second for Bromley. Bromley won the match 1-0 therefore claiming the trophy for the first time.

Route to the Final

Wrexham

Bromley

Match

Details

References

FA Trophy Finals
FA Trophy Final
FA Trophy Final
Events at Wembley Stadium
FA Trophy Final
FA Trophy Final 2022
FA Trophy Final 2022